Zdenko "Denny" Vrandečić (born 27 February 1978 in Stuttgart, Germany) is a Croatian computer scientist. He was a co-developer of Semantic MediaWiki and Wikidata, the lead developer of the Wikifunctions project, and an employee of the Wikimedia Foundation as a Head of Special Projects, Structured Content. He published modules for the German role-playing game The Dark Eye.

He lives in the San Francisco Bay Area in California, United States.

Education 
Vrandečić attended the Geschwister-Scholl Gymnasium in Stuttgart and from 1997 he studied computer science and philosophy at the University of Stuttgart. He received his doctorate in 2010 at the Karlsruhe Institute of Technology (KIT), where he was a research associate in the Knowledge Management Research Group at the Institute for Applied Computer Science and Formal Description Languages (AFIB), with Rudi Studer, from 2004 to 2012. In 2010, he visited the University of Southern California (ISI).

Career and research
Vrandečić is involved in knowledge bases, data mining, massive web-based collaboration, and the Semantic Web. In 2012/2013, he was project manager for Wikidata (Wikipedia sister project) at Wikimedia Germany. Together with Markus Krötzsch (who was also at KIT in the Knowledge Management group), he is co-developer of the Semantic MediaWiki (SMW), which was also the inspiration for Wikidata.

In 2013 Vrandečić worked as an ontologist at Google on the Knowledge Graph, the knowledge base used by Google to compile its search engine results with semantic information from various sources. In September 2019, Vrandečić announced that he was taking on a new role in Google's development department as Wikimedian in Residence, which consisted of explaining Wikimedia projects to other employees. 

In July 2020, he left Google to join the Wikimedia Foundation, where he has since been involved in building Wikifunctions and Abstract Wikipedia. It aims to use structured data from Wikidata to create a multilingual, machine-driven knowledge platform. In his essay contribution to Wikipedia's 20th anniversary publication, Wikipedia @ 20 - Stories of an Unfinished Revolution, he elaborates both technical and personal reasoning on urgencies for smaller and even for bigger language Wikipedia editions.

Vrandečić is one of the founders and administrators of Croatian Wikipedia. In 2008, he served as head of the scientific program of Wikimania. Vrandečić served on the Board of Trustees from 2015 to 2016.

Publications 
Vrandečić's publications include:

Personal life
Vrandečić holds both Croatian and US citizenship. He lives with his wife and daughter in the Bay Area.

References

Wikipedia people
Google employees
Wikimedia Foundation staff members
Karlsruhe Institute of Technology alumni
21st-century Croatian scientists
1978 births
Living people
Computer scientists